Praya (Indonesian: Praya or Kecamatan Praya) is the capital town of Central Lombok Regency (Indonesian: Kabupaten Lombok Tengah) on Lombok Island in the province of West Nusa Tenggara, Indonesia. It is a predominantly Muslim town, with minorities of Balinese inhabitants following Hinduism and Chinese inhabitants following Buddhism or Christianity.

Transportation
It is located a short distance to the north of the Bandara Internasional Lombok airport , which opened on 1 October 2011. The airport is the island's only operational airport and provides services for both international and domestic operations. It is also the only international airport serving the province of West Nusa Tenggara.

Climate
Praya has a tropical savanna climate (Aw) with moderate to little rainfall from May to October and heavy rainfall from November to April.

References

Populated places in Lombok
Regency seats of West Nusa Tenggara